Michelle Carter may refer to:

 Michelle Carter (athlete) (born 1985), American shot putter
 Michelle Carter (comics), a DC Comics character
 Michelle Carter (born 1996), American woman convicted of manslaughter in the death of Conrad Roy
 "Michelle Carter", 2021 single by the band SKYND based on the Michelle Carter manslaughter case